Rick Gibson (born October 27, 1961) is a Canadian professional golfer who plays primarily in Asia.

Early life 
Gibson was born in Calgary, Alberta, Canada. He played college golf at Brigham Young University, where he was an All-American in 1984.

Professional career 
Gibson played on the Canadian Tour after turning professional in 1984. Elsewhere, he played on the Asia Golf Circuit, where he won the Order of Merit in 1991, which then qualified him for  the Japan Golf Tour, where he won two tournaments. He later also played on the Asian Tour, winning once.

Professional wins (10)

Japan Golf Tour wins (2)

Japan Golf Tour playoff record (1–0)

Asian Tour wins (1)

Asian Tour playoff record (0–1)

Asia Golf Circuit wins (1)

Canadian Tour wins (3)

Other wins (2)
1991 Philippine PGA Championship
1992 Philippine PGA Championship

European Senior Tour wins (1)

Results in major championships

"T" = Tied
Note: Gibson only played in The Open Championship.

Results in senior major championships

"T" indicates a tie for a place
CUT = missed the halfway cut
Note: Gibson never played in The Tradition.

Team appearances
World Cup (representing Canada): 1990, 1994, 1995, 1996, 1997, 1998
Dunhill Cup (representing Canada): 1994 (winners), 1995, 1996

References

External links

Canadian male golfers
BYU Cougars men's golfers
Japan Golf Tour golfers
Asian Tour golfers
European Senior Tour golfers
PGA Tour Champions golfers
Golfing people from Alberta
Sportspeople from Calgary
1961 births
Living people